Grylloblatta oregonensis is a species of insect in the family Grylloblattidae. Its type locality is in Oregon Caves National Monument in the United States.

References

Grylloblattidae
Insects of the United States
Insects described in 2012

Endemic fauna of Oregon